The fourth series of MasterChef New Zealand was on air from 21 February 2013, with the chefs Simon Gault, Ray McVinnie, Josh Emett again acting as the series judges. The season was won by Aaron Brunet, narrowly beating runner-up Paula Saengthian-ngam by 75 points to 74.

Elimination table

 This contestant won the competition
 This contestant was the runner-up
 This contestant won the elimination challenge
 This contestant was in the winning team
 This contestant was in the bottom group
 This contestant was eliminated

Contestants

Episodes

MasterChef MasterClass
From week eight, the companion show MasterChef MasterClass was broadcast each week. It featured a weekly cooking class where the remaining contestants sat in on lessons from the judges and guest chefs.

 Episode 1 (30 March 2013) – At Kauri Cliffs resort in Northland, Josh Emett and Simon Gault are joined by executive chef Dale Gartland.

References 

Series 4
2013 New Zealand television seasons